Richard Wilson  (born Iain Carmichael Wilson; 9 July 1936) is a Scottish actor, theatre director and broadcaster. He is most famous for playing Victor Meldrew in the BBC sitcom One Foot in the Grave. Another notable role was as Gaius, the court physician of Camelot, in the BBC drama Merlin.

Early life 

Wilson was born in Greenock, Scotland.

He had an older sister,
Moira (b.1929), who died aged 91 on 15 January 2021.
He went to the Lady Alice Primary school in Greenock. He studied science subjects at Greenock Academy, then completed his National Service with the Royal Army Medical Corps, serving in Singapore.

Career 
Wilson worked in a laboratory at Stobhill Hospital in Glasgow as a research assistant before switching to acting at age 27. He trained at RADA and then appeared in repertory theatres in Edinburgh (Traverse Theatre), Glasgow and Manchester (Stables Theatre).

Wilson initially turned down the role of Victor Meldrew and it was almost offered to Les Dawson before Wilson changed his mind.

Wilson was awarded the OBE in the 1994 Birthday Honours for services to Drama. In April 1996, he was elected Rector of the University of Glasgow for a term of three years.

The narration of "The Man Who Called Himself Jesus", from Strawbs' eponymous first album, was performed by Wilson.

Wilson's biography, One Foot on the Stage: The Biography of Richard Wilson, was written by James Roose-Evans.

In March 2011, Wilson presented an edition of the Channel 4 current affairs programme Dispatches entitled Train Journeys From Hell, with transport journalist Christian Wolmar highlighting the failings of the British railway network.

Personal life
Wilson has been a campaigner for gay rights for many years. He appeared at charity events organised by gay rights campaign group Stonewall, but had not discussed his own sexuality in interviews with the media. He was named in a list of influential gay people in 2013 by Time Out magazine, which he considered to have outed him.

Wilson is a supporter of his local football club, Greenock Morton, but he has come to lend greater support to English club Manchester United. He is a patron of the Manchester United Supporters Trust. Wilson is a good friend of his One Foot in the Grave co-star Angus Deayton, and is godfather to Deayton's son.

Wilson is one of the patrons of Scottish Youth Theatre. Wilson is also a long-time supporter of the charity Sense and in 2007 hosted their annual award ceremony. He is also one of the honorary patrons of the London children's charity, Scene & Heard. He has been Honorary President of the Scottish Community Drama Association (SCDA) since 1998.

Wilson is a supporter of the Labour Party and recorded the party's manifesto on audio for the 2010 general election.

It was reported on 12 August 2016 that Wilson had suffered a heart attack. He had been due to reprise the role of Victor Meldrew in a one-man show at the 2016 Edinburgh Festival Fringe.

In June 2021 Wilson was the guest on BBC Radio 4's Desert Island Discs. His choices included 
"Hammond Song" by The Roches, Symphony No. 6 in D minor by Sibelius and "The First Time Ever I Saw Your Face" by Roberta Flack. His book choice was the poetry of Robert Burns and his luxury item was a subscription to The Guardian.

Wilson had one older sister, Moira, who died aged 91.

Filmography

Films 
 Junket 89 (1970) as Mr. Potter
 The Trouble with 2B (1972) as Mr. Potter
 Mark Gertler: Fragments of a Biography (1981) as Clive Bell
 Those Glory Glory Days (1983, TV Movie) as Arnold – Journalist
 A Passage to India (1984) as Turton
 Foreign Body (1986) as Col. Partridge
 Whoops Apocalypse (1986) as Nigel Lipman
 Prick Up Your Ears (1987) as Psychiatrist
 How to Get Ahead in Advertising (1989) as Bristol
 A Dry White Season (1989) as Cloete
 Soft Top Hard Shoulder (1992) as Uncle Salvatore
 Carry On Columbus (1992) as Don Juan Felipe
 The Man Who Knew Too Little (1997) as Sir Roger Daggenhurst
 Women Talking Dirty (1999) as Ronald
 Love and Other Disasters (2006) as Registrar
 Gnomeo & Juliet (2011) as Mr. Capulet (voice)
 Sherlock Gnomes (2018) as Mr. Capulet (voice)

Television 
 Crown Court (1970s) – as Jeremy Parsons QC (1972–1984)
 My Good Woman (1972–1974)
Soldier and me (1974) – as Dr Nixon
 A Sharp Intake of Breath 1977 to 1980
 The Sweeney episode "The bigger they are" as DCI Anderson (1978)
 Some Mothers Do 'Ave 'Em episode "Wendy House" as Mr. Harris The Insurance Man (1978)
 Only When I Laugh (1979–1982) as Gordon Thorpe
 In Loving Memory as Percy Openshaw (in two episodes)
 Andy Robson (1982–1983)
 The Adventures of Sherlock Holmes episode The Red Headed League as Duncan Ross (1985)
 Have I Got News for You
 Screen Two: Poppyland (1985) as Theodore Watts-Dunton
 Howards' Way (1986 one episode) as Viscount Cunningham
 Emmerdale (1986)
 Room at the Bottom (1986–1988) as Toby Duckworth
 High & Dry as Richard Talbot
 Tutti Frutti (1987)
 Hot Metal (1988)
 The Play on One: Normal Service (1988) as Max
 Screen Two: Fellow Traveller (1989) Sir Hugo
 One Foot in the Grave (1990–2000) as Victor Meldrew
 Cluedo (1991) as Reverend Jonathan Green
 Selling Hitler (1991)
 Mr. Bean – episode The Trouble with Mr. Bean as Mr. A. M. Peggit The Dentist (1992)
 Inspector Morse – episode "Absolute Conviction (1992)"
 The World of Peter Rabbit and Friends as Mr. McGregor (1992)
 Under the Hammer (1994) (as Ben Glazier)
 Gulliver's Travels (1996)
 Lord of Misrule (1996) (as Bill Webster). Filmed at Fowey in Cornwall
 Duck Patrol (1998)
 Father Ted – episode "The Mainland" as himself (1998)
 The Mrs Merton Show (1998) guest appearance alongside Bernard Manning
 High Stakes (2001)
 Life As We Know It (2001)
 Jeffrey Archer: The Truth as Duke of Edinburgh (2002)
 King of Fridges (2004) (as Frank)
 Doctor Who – episodes "The Empty Child" and "The Doctor Dances" (2005) – Doctor Constantine
 Born and Bred (2005)
 The F Word – Appeared as himself in the middle of the first series. (2005)
 A Harlot's Progress (2006)
 Would I Lie to You? (2007)
 Thank God You're Here (2008)
 Merlin  – (all 65 episodes + 2 Children in Need specials) as Gaius (2008–2012)
 Demons – as Father Simeon (2009)
 Britain's Best Drives (2009)
 New Tricks (2009) – as Father Bernárd in episode "The War Against Drugs"
 Confessions from the Underground – Narrated (2012)
 All Aboard East Coast Trains – Narrated (2013)
 Richard Wilson on the Road (2015)
 Trollied (2015)
  (2017) travel in style by rail and ship through the Scottish Highlands (documentary)
 Around the World in 80 Days (2021)

Stage acting 

 Twelfth Night, as Malvolio – Royal Shakespeare Company
 Whipping it Up by Steve Thompson – Bush Theatre, Ambassadors Theatre
 What the Butler Saw, as Dr Rance – Royal National Theatre
 Peter Pan, as Mr Darling/Captain Hook – Royal Festival Hall
 Waiting for Godot, as Vladimir – Traverse Theatre, Edinburgh and Royal Exchange Theatre, Manchester
 Uncle Vanya, as Vanya – Traverse Theatre
 A Little Hotel on the Side by Georges Feydeau – Theatre Royal, Bath, August 2013
 Krapp's Last Tape, as Krapp, Sheffield Crucible Theatre, 25 June – 19 July 2014
 Forty Years On by Alan Bennett – Chichester Festival Theatre, as the Headmaster 21 April – 20 May 2017.

Theatre direction 

Wilson won the TMA Best Director Award in 2000 for Mr Kolpert.

 An Inspector Calls by J B Priestley – The Royal Exchange Theatre, Manchester, 1986
 A Wholly Healthy Glasgow by Ian Heggie – The Royal Exchange Theatre, Edinburgh International Festival, The Royal Court, 1988/89
 Women Laughing by Michael Wall – The Royal Exchange Theatre, (1992)
 The Lodger by Simon Burke. World premiere at the Royal Exchange Theatre, (1994)
 Primo 2004
 The Woman Before by Roland Schimmelpfennig – Royal Court, May 2005
 East Coast Chicken Supper by Martin J Taylor – The Traverse, 2005
 Rainbow Kiss by Simon Farquhar – Royal Court, April 2006
 Smack Family Robinson by Richard Bean – Kingston upon Thames, March and April 2013
 Blasted by Sarah Kane – Sheffield Studio, 2015
 Peggy For You by Alan Plater – Hampstead Theatre, 2021

Radio 
 The Corrupted (BBC Radio 4 2017) as Melford Stevenson
 Believe It! (BBC Radio 4). As himself in a spoof comic autobiography written by Jon Canter
Radio Diaries (BBC Radio 4 2021) as Archie, a former tango dance partner/teacher on cruise liners, now in a care home, looking back over his life relationship with the tango. Written by Ron Hutchinson.

Exercise videos 
 Let's Dance (1996)

References

Further reading 
 J. Roose-Evans, One Foot on the Stage: The Biography of Richard Wilson

External links 

 
 The Official Richard Wilson Archive
 Exclusive Interview with Richard Wilson

1936 births
20th-century British Army personnel
Alumni of RADA
Best Entertainment Performance BAFTA Award (television) winners
British male comedy actors
British theatre directors
Labour Party (UK) people
Scottish LGBT broadcasters
Scottish LGBT rights activists
LGBT theatre directors
Living people
Officers of the Order of the British Empire
People from Greenock
Rectors of the University of Glasgow
Royal Army Medical Corps soldiers
Scottish gay actors
Scottish male film actors
Scottish male stage actors
Scottish male television actors
Scottish television presenters
Scottish theatre directors